Nexus 7 is a series of Android-based mini tablet computers co-developed by Google, and may refer to:

 Nexus 7 (2012), the first generation 
 Nexus 7 (2013), the second generation